Israel sent a delegation to compete at the 1992 Summer Paralympics in Barcelona, Catalonia, Spain. Its athletes finished 38th in the overall medal count.

Nations at the 1992 Summer Paralympics
1992
Summer Paralympics